The 2011 Samford Bulldogs team represented Samford University in the 2011 NCAA Division I FCS football season. The Bulldogs were led by fifth-year head coach Pat Sullivan and played their home games at Seibert Stadium. They are a member of the Southern Conference. They finished the season 6–5, 4–4 in SoCon play to finish in fifth place.

Schedule

References

Samford
Samford Bulldogs football seasons
Samford Bulldogs football